Spalding County is a county located in the west central portion of the U.S. state of Georgia. As of the 2020 census, the population was 67,306. The county seat is Griffin. The county was created December 20, 1851 and named for former United States representative and senator Thomas Spalding.

Spalding County is included in the Atlanta-Sandy Springs-Roswell, GA Metropolitan Statistical Area.

Geography
The county is located in the Piedmont region of the state.

The western portion of Spalding County, west of a line from Sunny Side through Griffin to Orchard Hill, is located in the Upper Flint River sub-basin of the ACF River Basin (Apalachicola-Chattahoochee-Flint River Basin). The eastern part of the county is located in the Upper Ocmulgee River sub-basin of the Altamaha River basin.

Major highways

  Interstate 75
  U.S. Route 19
  U.S. Route 19 Business
  U.S. Route 41
  U.S. Route 41 Business
  State Route 3
  State Route 7
  State Route 16
  State Route 92
  State Route 155
  State Route 362
  State Route 401 (unsigned designation for I-75)

Adjacent counties

 Henry County (northeast)
 Butts County (east)
 Lamar County (southeast)
 Pike County (southwest)
 Meriwether County (west)
 Coweta County (west)
 Fayette County (northwest)
 Clayton County (northwest)

Demographics

2000 census
As of the census of 2000, there were 58,417 people, 21,519 households, and 15,773 families living in the county. There were 23,001 housing units at an average density of 116 per square mile (45/km2). The racial makeup of the county was 66.50% White, 31.05% Black or African American, 0.23% Native American, 0.67% Asian, 0.02% Pacific Islander, 0.65% from other races, and 0.88% from two or more races. 1.62% of the population were Hispanic or Latino of any race.

There were 21,519 households, out of which 34.00% had children under the age of 18 living with them, 50.30% were married couples living together, 18.20% had a female householder with no husband present, and 26.70% were non-families. 22.30% of all households were made up of individuals, and 8.50% had someone living alone who was 65 years of age or older. The average household size was 2.67 and the average family size was 3.12.

In the county, the population was spread out, with 27.30% under the age of 18, 9.20% from 18 to 24, 29.40% from 25 to 44, 22.50% from 45 to 64, and 11.70% who were 65 years of age or older. The median age was 35 years. For every 100 females, there were 93.20 males.  For every 100 females age 18 and over, there were 88.90 males.

The median income for a household in the county was $36,221, and the median income for a family was $41,631. Males had a median income of $32,347 versus $22,114 for females. The per capita income for the county was $16,791. About 12.40% of families and 15.50% of the population were below the poverty line, including 21.30% of those under age 18 and 11.30% of those age 65 or over.

2010 census
As of the 2010 United States Census, there were 64,073 people, 23,565 households, and 16,869 families living in the county. The racial makeup of the county was 62.7% white, 32.8% black or African American, 0.9% Asian, 0.3% American Indian, 0.1% Pacific islander, 1.6% from other races, and 1.6% from two or more races. Those of Hispanic or Latino origin made up 3.8% of the population. In terms of European ancestry, 23.3% were American, 7.6% were Irish, and 6.9% were English.

Of the 23,565 households, 36.2% had children under the age of 18 living with them, 46.3% were married couples living together, 19.4% had a female householder with no husband present, 28.4% were non-families, and 23.5% of all households were made up of individuals. The average household size was 2.67 and the average family size was 3.12. The median age was 37.2 years.

The median income for a household in the county was $41,100 and the median income for a family was $49,640. Males had a median income of $37,976 versus $30,684 for females. The per capita income for the county was $19,607. About 17.2% of families and 21.2% of the population were below the poverty line, including 30.4% of those under age 18 and 14.0% of those age 65 or over.

2020 census

As of the 2020 United States census, there were 67,306 people, 25,339 households, and 16,563 families residing in the county.

Education
The Griffin-Spalding County School District has 11 elementary schools, 4 middle schools, 2 high schools, and 4 complementary programs.

Communities

Cities
 Griffin (county seat)
 Sunny Side

Town
 Orchard Hill

Census-designated places
 East Griffin
 Experiment

Politics
Spalding County is solidly Republican at the Presidential level having last voted for a Democrat in 1980 when it voted for Jimmy Carter. Since then the closest a Democrat has been to winning Spalding County was in 1992 when Bill Clinton lost to George H. W. Bush by 5.6 percent.

See also

 National Register of Historic Places listings in Spalding County, Georgia
List of counties in Georgia

References

External links

 County website
 Spalding County Genealogy
 Doc Holliday (John Henry Holliday) Biography and Photos

 
Georgia (U.S. state) counties
1851 establishments in Georgia (U.S. state)
Spalding
Populated places established in 1851